Lagganstown is an area in County Tipperary, Ireland. Lagganstown Upper and Lagganstown Lower (Baile an Logáin Íochtarach) are townlands within the civil parish of Relickmurry and Athassel and historical barony of Clanwilliam.

References

Geography of County Tipperary